The 1933 South Sydney season was the 26th in the club's history. The club competed in the New South Wales Rugby Football League Premiership (NSWRFL), finishing the season third.

Ladder

Fixtures

Regular season

Finals

References

South Sydney Rabbitohs seasons
South Sydney Rabbitohs season